Rhombodera titania is a species of praying mantises in the family Mantidae, found in Indomalaya.

See also
List of mantis genera and species

References

T
Mantodea of Asia
Insects described in 1877